Squadron Leader Lewis Brandon DSO DFC and Bar (1911-22 April 2002) was an actor in the 1930s and served in the Royal Air Force as a navigator in night fighters during World War Two.

Brandon's acting career lasted throughout the 1930s and included regular work as a body double for actors such as Rex Harrison, Robert Donat and Robert Newton.

After being called up to wartime service, he joined the Royal Air Force and flew on around 80 defence flights over Britain and about 50 across Europe,  flying Bristol Beaufighters and de Havilland Mosquitos.  He received one Distinguished Service Orders and two Distinguished Flying Crosses.

After leaving the RAF in 1955, he ran a café in Melton Mowbray before moving to Brighton to run the Rex Hotel. In 1961, his autobiographical book Night Flyer, which described his wartime experiences, was published and was "warmly praised by Winston Churchill".
In 1965 he moved to a house in neighbouring Hove and took over as landlord of the Albion Inn there.

Brandon was married and had four children.

References

Bibliography

Royal Air Force officers
Companions of the Distinguished Service Order
Recipients of the Distinguished Flying Cross (United Kingdom)
People from Hove
1911 births
2002 deaths